The Severnside Sirens are a system of Civil defense sirens located along the South Severn Estuary coastline from Redcliffe Bay to Pilning, northwest of Bristol. They are activated by Avon and Somerset Police in the event of a potential incident at one of the COMAH sites located in the area, mainly in and near Avonmouth. The system was setup in 1997 following a fire at the Albright and Wilson site in 1996.

Severnside Sirens Trust 
Severnside Sirens Trust Limited is the organisation responsible for maintaining the system. It is a registered company (number 3348008) and charity (number 1063224) and was incorporated on 9 April 1997. The trust's activities are funded by the 3 local authorities whose constituents the sirens serve, North Somerset Council, Bristol City Council, and South Gloucestershire Council, and from donations from the organisations running the COMAH sites themselves.

Sirens 

The sirens themselves are mounted on dedicated poles and all but one are manufactured by the Federal Signal Corporation. Most of them are Federal Signal Modulators. They are operated via radio signal from a control system at Avon and Somerset Police Headquarters in Portishead.

Testing 
The sirens are tested at 1500 on the 3rd of every month. The test comprises the following:

 3 minutes of the alert warning (a continuous, stepped, rising tone)
 1 minute of silence
 1 minute of the all clear siren (a continuous constant tone)

Local volunteers monitor the sirens on test day.

References

External links 
 Severnside Sirens Trust - the charitable organisation responsible for running the system

Warning systems
Sirens
Emergency population warning systems